Shivani Rajashekar is an Indian actress and model who appears primarily in Telugu and Tamil films. She made her acting debut with the film Adbhutham (2021). In 2022, Shivani was supposed to represent Tamil Nadu in the Femina Miss India 2022 but withdrew due to medical reasons.

Early life 
Shivani was born on 1 July 1996 in Chennai, Tamil Nadu to Rajasekhar and Jeevitha. She was then raised in Hyderabad, Telangana.

Filmography

References

External links 

 

1996 births
Telugu actresses
Actresses from Chennai
Actresses in Telugu cinema
Actresses in Tamil cinema
Indian Hindus
21st-century Indian actresses
Indian film actresses
Female models from Chennai
Living people